The 2002 United States Senate election in Idaho took place on November 4, 2002. Incumbent Republican U.S. Senator Larry Craig won re-election to a third term.

Democratic primary

Candidates 
 Alan Blinken, former United States Ambassador to Belgium
 Dave Sneddon

Results

Libertarian primary

Candidates 
 Donovan Bramwell, perennial candidate

Results

Republican primary

Candidates 
 Larry Craig, incumbent U.S. Senator

Results

General election

Candidates 
 Alan Blinken (D), former United States Ambassador to Belgium
 Donovan Bramwell (L), perennial candidate
 Larry Craig (R), incumbent U.S. Senator

Debates
Complete video of debate, October 27, 2002
Complete video of debate, October 30, 2002

Results

See also 
 2002 United States Senate elections

References 

2002 Idaho elections
2002
Idaho